Lawrence Peyton (died October 10, 1918) was a silent film actor in the United States. He starred in the 1914 film based on Jack London's Martin Eden.

Personal life
Peyton served as a private in the 813th Pioneer Infantry Regiment of the United States Army during World War I. He was killed in action in France on October 10, 1918, and was buried at the Oise-Aisne American Cemetery.

Filmography
When the Blood Calls (1913) with Mona Darkfeather
Martin Eden (1914 film)
The Boer War (film) (1914)
The Unafraid (1915)
A Gentleman of Leisure (1915 film)
The Goose Girl (1915 film)
Buck's Lady Friend (1915)
A Man's Friend (1916)
Joan the Woman (1916)Joan of the Angels (1916)The Red Ace (1917)The Golden Fetter (1917)How Could You, Jean?'' (1918)

References

1918 deaths
20th-century American male actors
American male silent film actors
United States Army personnel of World War I
United States Army soldiers
American military personnel killed in World War I